Ionela-Livia Cozmiuc ( Lehaci; born 3 January 1995) is a Romanian rower. She is three-times world champion in the women's lightweight double sculls for Romania winning back to back world titles in 2017 and 2018, and taking another title in 2022. She competed in the women's lightweight double sculls event at the 2016 Summer Olympics.

In 2017, she married fellow Olympic rower Marius Cozmiuc.

References

External links

1995 births
Living people
Romanian female rowers
Olympic rowers of Romania
Rowers at the 2016 Summer Olympics
Place of birth missing (living people)
World Rowing Championships medalists for Romania
Rowers at the 2020 Summer Olympics
20th-century Romanian women
21st-century Romanian women